Chvaletice Power Station is a large lignite-fired power station at Chvaletice in the Czech Republic, owned by Pavel Tykač. Its installed power output is 4x 200 MW. Blocks 3 and 4 use a chimney which is 305 metres tall, built in 1977. It is the tallest free-standing structure in the Czech Republic.

See also

List of tallest structures in the Czech Republic

References

External links
Info on ČEZ website

Towers completed in 1977
Coal-fired power stations in the Czech Republic
Chimneys in the Czech Republic
Pardubice District